Andy Rogers (born August 25, 1986) is a Canadian former professional ice hockey defenceman. He was drafted in the first round, 30th overall, by the Tampa Bay Lightning in the 2004 NHL Entry Draft.

Playing career
Rogers played for the Western Hockey League's Calgary Hitmen from 2003–2005, and for the Prince George Cougars from 2005–06.

Rogers made his pro debut in the 2006–07 season with the Lightning's AHL affiliate, the Springfield Falcons. He was traded on March 4, 2009 along with Olaf Kolzig, Jamie Heward and a fourth-round draft pick to the Toronto Maple Leafs for Richard Petiot. Rogers was then sent down to their AHL farm club, the Toronto Marlies.

On October 4, 2009, Rogers was re-signed by the Marlies under a professional try-out contract. After going scoreless through six games, he was released from his contract on December 10, 2009. He then played 11 games with the Victoria Salmon Kings of the ECHL before hanging up his skates.

Career statistics

Regular season and playoffs

International

Sexual Assault Allegations 
https://vancouverisland.ctvnews.ca/victoria-real-estate-agents-fired-after-sexual-assault-allegations

References

External links

1986 births
Canadian ice hockey defencemen
Calgary Hitmen players
Living people
Mississippi Sea Wolves players
National Hockey League first-round draft picks
Norfolk Admirals players
Ice hockey people from Calgary
Prince George Cougars players
Springfield Falcons players
Tampa Bay Lightning draft picks
Toronto Marlies players
Victoria Salmon Kings players